Carla King is a lecturer at St Patrick's College, Dublin and an author in Irish history. According to Diarmaid Ferriter, she is "peerless in her expertise on Michael Davitt".

Works

References

21st-century Irish historians
Irish women non-fiction writers
Historians of the Land War
Living people
Year of birth missing (living people)